Carlos Alfredo Cat Vidal (July 2, 1930 - March 28, 2006) was a Uruguayan civil engineer and politician.

A member of the National Party, he served as Ministry of Labour and Social Welfare (1990-1991), President of BROU (1993-1995) and Minister of Housing, Territorial Planning and Environment (2000-2002).

He died in 2006, and is buried at the Central Cemetery of Montevideo.

References

1930 births
2006 deaths
People from Montevideo
University of the Republic (Uruguay) alumni
Uruguayan civil engineers
National Party (Uruguay) politicians
Ministers of Labor and Social Affairs of Uruguay
Directors of the Office of Planning and Budgeting of Uruguay
Ministers of Housing, Territorial Planning and Environment of Uruguay
Burials at the Central Cemetery of Montevideo